Baltic Deputy is a 1936 Soviet drama film directed by Iosif Kheifits and Aleksandr Zarkhi.

Plot 
The Bolsheviks seize power in Russia. Students instead of studying are fond of politics. Teachers and scientists do not trust the new government. But the elderly professor Dmitry Illarionovich Polezhaev was able to understand the events that occurred in Russia and begin to train the Baltic sailors, after which he is elected a deputy from the sailor of the Baltic Fleet.

Cast 
Nikolay Cherkasov	as Professor Dmitri Illarionovich Polezhayev
 Mariya Domashyova	as Masha Polezhayeva	
 Boris Livanov as Misha Bocharov
 Oleg Zhakov as Vikenti Mikhailovich Vorob'yov	
 Aleksandr Melnikov as Red guardsman Kupriyanov
 Mikhail Dubrava	
 N. Kakharinov	
 A. Mazurin
 Aleksei Matov	
 Fyodor Kurikhin

References

External links 

1936 films
1930s Russian-language films
Soviet black-and-white films
Soviet drama films
1936 drama films